is a Japanese voice actress. Her voice-over credits include the Japanese dub voices of Dexter in Dexter's Laboratory, Swayzak from Toonami, and Dib Membrane in Invader Zim.

Notable roles
1994
Omakase Scrappers as Akira
Yamato Takeru as Kiriomi
1995
El Hazard: The Wanderers as Crayna-Crayna
Fushigi Yûgi as Young Hotohori
Magical Girl Pretty Sammy as Gunman Girl (ep. 10)
1998
Bakusō Kyōdai Let's & Go!! MAX as Zen Kusanagi
Cowboy Bebop as Cain
El Hazard: The Alternative World as Klenna Klenna (ep. 15)
1999
Detective Conan as Takada Tomohiro (ep. 149)
2002
Hanada Shōnen Shi as Machida-sensei
2003
Midnight Horror School as Juno; Mr. X
2006
Kiba as Guljef

Films
Porco Rosso (1992)
Ultra Nyan: Hoshizora Kara Maiorita Fushigi Neko as Mamoru (1997)

Video Games
Power Stone 2 as Pete (2000)
Kingdom Hearts Birth by Sleep as Anastasia (2010)

Dubbing roles

Live-action
Apollo 13 as Mary (Tracy Reiner)
The Bone Collector (2002 TV Asahi edition) as Nurse Thelma (Queen Latifah)
The Butler as Gloria Gaines (Oprah Winfrey)
Deception as Detective Russo (LisaGay Hamilton)
Die Hard with a Vengeance as Officer Jane
Double Jeopardy as Evelyn Lake (Davenia McFadden)
Doubt as Mrs. Miller (Viola Davis)
The Fast and the Furious as Letty Ortiz (Michelle Rodriguez)
Forrest Gump as Louise (Margo Moorer)
The Help as Aibileen Clark (Viola Davis)
Power Rangers Lost Galaxy as Hexuba
Reality Bites as Vickie Miner (Janeane Garofalo)
Sphere as Alice "Teeny" Fletcher (Queen Latifah)

Animation
Cinderella as Anastasia
Cybersix as Julian
Dexter's Laboratory as Dexter
Invader Zim as Dib Membrane
Planes: Fire & Rescue as Dynamite
SWAT Kats: The Radical Squadron as Lil' Old Woman
Star Wars: Ewoks as Teebo
Toonami: Trapped in Hyperspace as Swayzak

References

External links
 
Mouse Promotion

Japanese voice actresses
1966 births
Living people
Place of birth missing (living people)